Fort Washington is an unincorporated area and census-designated place in Prince George's County, Maryland, United States. It borders the Potomac River, situated 20 miles south of the downtown Washington, DC. As of the 2020 census it had a population of 24,261. The Fort Washington community is located west of Maryland Route 210, with some additional area to the east of the highway.

History

The Fort

The community is named for Fort Washington. The first Fort Washington was completed in 1809, and was the only defensive fort protecting Washington, D.C. It consisted of a small earthwork near the Potomac River shore. The failure of that fort to stop a British fleet from invading the national capital during the War of 1812 led to the construction of the current, larger, stone fortification. In 1844, a cannon exploded on the USS Princeton as it was passing Fort Washington. During World War II, the US Army's Adjutant General's School was located at the fort, and had billeting for 362 officers and 2,526 enlisted persons.

The site is now part of a very extensive park with views of the Potomac River and hiking paths. It is a scenic place for picnicking, fishing and outdoor recreation.  (Admission is free to people entering after business hours and before sunset.)

War of 1812
During the War of 1812 Fort Washington, built to protect the capital from enemy advances on the Potomac River, was captured by the British under the command of Admiral Gordon, three days after the  burning of the capital.

Civil War

Upon the outbreak of the American Civil War, fearing for the safety of Washington in case of attack, Secretary of the Navy Isaac Toucey ordered a detachment of US Marines to garrison the fort.

In May 1865 Secretary of the Navy Gideon Welles ordered the Potomac Flotilla reduced to half strength due to cessation of hostilities. This included the removal of the Marines from Fort Washington.

Twentieth century to present

Near the fort are many riverfront homes, two marinas, two community pools, and National Golf Club. The area was rural until about 1960 when suburban growth began and is continuing to grow, adding new, large family homes in small developments next to older existing developments. Until the founding of the Oxon Hill post office about 1960, the Fort Washington area generally used the mailing address Washington, D.C., except for the few years that Friendly had a post office.  About 1980 the postal service split the Fort Washington area from Oxon Hill, defining it as a separate town name.  At that time, to make mail sorting easier, they drew the boundary between the two communities to conform to already existing zip code boundaries.  The end result sometimes confuses people, since the northern end of the Fort Washington postal area (near the Beltway) identifies more with the communities Oxon Hill or Temple Hills / Camp Springs but still uses a Fort Washington mailing address.

Geography
Fort Washington is located at  (38.743481, -77.010383).

First-time visitors are often confused by the several "Livingston Roads" which repeatedly crosses Route 210, as well as by the two separate "Old Fort Roads", causing them to make wrong turns off of Maryland Route 210.  Eventually all roads intersecting Route 210 in the Fort Washington area (from the Beltway as far south as the highway 210 curve at Piscataway Creek) are planned for upgrading to controlled-access interchanges (eliminating all traffic signals) gradually during the 2020s decade.

The fort’s land originally included 347 acres, which was last surveyed in June 1944.

Community institutions
The Maryland-National Capital Park and Planning Commission (M-NCPPC) maintains the Harmony Hall Regional Center , including the John Addison Concert Hall, site of community theater ("Tantallon Community Players"), art shows, frequent concerts, and a variety of classes for all ages.  A YMCA fitness center operated from 2005 until 2016, and a community center facility opened in 2013 in Fort Washington Forest.  The 12,000-member Ebenezer A.M.E. Church is noteworthy, as is a large nursery/landscaping business and a popular motorcycle shop. There is a small 50-bed hospital (Fort Washington Hospital). Many highly successful African-Americans live in Fort Washington; there are also some Ethiopian residents and a large, long-established ethnic Filipino population.

Government
Prince George's County Police Department District 7 Station in Fort Washington CDP serves the community.

The U.S. Postal Service operates the Fort Washington Post Office in Fort Washington CDP.

Demographics

2020 census

Note: the US Census treats Hispanic/Latino as an ethnic category. This table excludes Latinos from the racial categories and assigns them to a separate category. Hispanics/Latinos can be of any race.

Per the 2020 census, the population was 24,261.

2000 Census
As of the census of 2010, there were 23,717 people, 8,135 households, and 6,319 families residing in the CDP. The racial makeup of the CDP was 70.6% African American, 13.40% White, 9.2% Asian (mostly Filipino), 0.2% Native American, 0.00% Pacific Islander, 3.3% from other races, and 2.38% from two or more races. Hispanic or Latino of any race were 6.6% of the population.

There were 8,135 households, out of which 26.5% had children under the age of 18 living with them, 57.9% were married couples living together, 14.7% had a female householder with no husband present, and 22.3% were non-families. 18.3% of all households were made up of individuals, and 7.1% had someone living alone who was 65 years of age or older. The average household size was 2.89 and the average family size was 3.24.

In the CDP, the population was spread out, with 21.7% under the age of 18, 5.2% from 20 to 24, 21.9% from 25 to 44, 32.9% from 45 to 64, and 16.1% who were 65 years of age or older. The median age was 44.3 years. For every 100 females, there were 91.6 males. For every 100 females age 18 and over, there were 89.3 males.

According to a 2007 estimate, the median income for a household in the CDP was $105,475, and the median income for a family was $111,227. In 2000, males had a median income of $46,656 versus $42,450 for females. The per capita income for the CDP was $30,871. About 2.8% of families and 3.7% of the population were below the poverty line, including 5.0% of those under age 18 and 4.5% of those age 65 or over. By the end of 2020, the CDP ranks # 5 among top 10 richest black communities in US, with an average family income of $114,234.

Transportation
Potomac Airfield is in Friendly CDP, with a Fort Washington address.  Several Metrobus routes serve the area.

Education
Fort Washington is under the Prince George's County Public Schools district.

Zoned elementary schools serving the CDP are:
Fort Foote Elementary School
Fort Washington Forest Elementary School
Indian Queen Elementary School
Potomac Landing Elementary School
Rose Valley Elementary School
Tayac Elementary School

Zoned middle schools serving the CDP are:
Oxon Hill Middle School
Isaac J. Gourdine Middle School
Accokeek Middle School

Zoned high schools serving the CDP are:
 Friendly High School
 Oxon Hill High School

The following private schools are located in Fort Washington
National Christian Academy
The Beddow Montessori School, Fort Washington Campus
Maryland International Day School

Notable people

 Riddick Bowe, 2 time world heavyweight boxing champion, has lived in Fort Washington for the last two decades.
 Seven Craft, participant of Bad Girls Club Season 17
 Donna Edwards, U.S. Representative for 
 Charles Gittens, first black United States Secret Service agent
 George O. Gore II, actor previously seen on My Wife and Kids
 Mike Gravel, former Senator (D-Alaska) and presidential candidate, previously lived in Tantallon.
 Joe Haden, Florida Gators cornerback and current cornerback for the Pittsburgh Steelers; attended Friendly High School
 Steny Hoyer, Majority Leader, United States House of Representatives, at one time lived in Friendly (source: Washington Post article, 2/26/2007)
 Jarrett Jack, NBA player
 Jeff Kinney, writer of the Diary of a Wimpy Kid series
 Martin Lawrence, Hollywood actor, attended Friendly High School
 G. Gordon Liddy, presidential aide convicted in the Watergate scandal, author, and later talk radio host
 Senator John Melcher of Montana
 Tim Miller, movie director and visual effects artist, animator
 Rev. C. Anthony Muse, Maryland State Senator , pastor of Ark of Safety Church  in Upper Marlboro, Maryland
 Stanley Turrentine, jazz musician, lived on Piscataway Drive
 Brian Westbrook, former Villanova football star (1997–2001) and former running back for the San Francisco 49ers and Philadelphia Eagles
 Byron Westbrook, former Salisbury University and Washington Redskins football player.

References

External links

 Fort Washington Park

Census-designated places in Prince George's County, Maryland
Census-designated places in Maryland
Maryland populated places on the Potomac River
Washington metropolitan area